Porky in Egypt is a 1938 Warner Bros. Looney Tunes cartoon directed by Bob Clampett. The short was released on November 5, 1938, and stars Porky Pig.

Plot
An offer for a trip to see the pyramids in Egypt is shown. The tour then proceeds to leave with a large caravan of camels being used as transportation. Porky then comes running out and chases after the caravan; but he is too late and ends up not being able to catch up to them. He sees an available camel called Humpty Bumpty however, and takes it with the intent of seeing the pyramids, but he ends up lost in the desert and eventually him and weirdly enough, the camel starts to suffer from dehydration. They start seeing various mirages that cause them to go into a dreamlike sequence where Porky and the camel both hallucinate and hear strange voices. The camel then starts acting weird and Porky tries to calm him down, but fails, and the camel grows more and more insane.  Eventually, they run screaming from the desert and back into the town, whereupon they lock themselves inside a safehouse. Humpty believes that they are safe, but Porky is then shown to have similarly lost his mind as he begins laughing hysterically, puts on an oversized bicorne hat with the letter N on it (an obvious allusion to Napoleon), and starts dancing in an exaggerated, chaotic fashion as the cartoon irises out.

Home media
DVD - Looney Tunes Golden Collection: Volume 3
Blu-ray - Looney Tunes Platinum Collection: Volume 2

Colorized version

Porky in Egypt was computer colorized in 1995 to be aired on television.

References

External links

1938 animated films
1938 films
Looney Tunes shorts
1930s animated short films
1930s American animated films
Films directed by Bob Clampett
Porky Pig films
Films set in Egypt
Films set in deserts
Films scored by Carl Stalling